East Side is a borough in Carbon County, Pennsylvania. It is part of Northeastern Pennsylvania. The population was 317 at the 2010 census.

Geography
East Side is located in northern Carbon County at  (41.060844, -75.763973), on the east side of the Lehigh River. To the west, directly across the river, is the borough of White Haven in Luzerne County.

Transportation

Interstate 80 passes through the south side of the borough, with access from Exit 274 (Pennsylvania Route 534) at the borough's eastern border. Additional access is from Exit 273 in White Haven via Pennsylvania Route 940.

Demographics

As of the census of 2000, there were 290 people, 129 households, and 77 families residing in the borough. The population density was 242.7 people per square mile (94.1/km²). There were 146 housing units at an average density of 122.2 per square mile (47.4/km²). The racial makeup of the borough was 97.93% White and 2.07% Native American. Hispanic or Latino of any race were 0.69% of the population.

There were 129 households, out of which 24.0% had children under the age of 18 living with them, 48.8% were married couples living together, 5.4% had a female householder with no husband present, and 40.3% were non-families. 34.1% of all households were made up of individuals, and 13.2% had someone living alone who was 65 years of age or older. The average household size was 2.25 and the average family size was 2.94.

In the borough the population was spread out, with 20.7% under the age of 18, 6.2% from 18 to 24, 27.2% from 25 to 44, 29.7% from 45 to 64, and 16.2% who were 65 years of age or older. The median age was 43 years. For every 100 females there were 92.1 males. For every 100 females age 18 and over, there were 93.3 males.

The median income for a household in the borough was $25,833, and the median income for a family was $35,833. Males had a median income of $30,481 versus $17,000 for females. The per capita income for the borough was $15,132. About 12.1% of families and 15.9% of the population were below the poverty line, including 23.4% of those under the age of eighteen and 14.8% of those sixty five or over.

References

Populated places established in 1892
Boroughs in Carbon County, Pennsylvania
1892 establishments in Pennsylvania